Corcelles-lès-Cîteaux is a commune in the Côte-d'Or department in eastern France.

Population

History 
The commune is located 18 km south of Dijon. It held several names throughout its history: Corcellae (in 871), Curcella (between 1100 and 1110), Curcellae (in 1163), Corcellae in Silva (throughout the 13th century), Corcellae in Nemore (in 1212), Corcellae aux Bois (in 1217), Corclles le bois lez Citeaux (in 1375),Courcelles le bois les Cisteulx (in 1544), Courcelles les Bois (in 1637), Corcelles lez Citeaux (in 1645) and Corcelles au Bois (under the first Republic).

See also
Communes of the Côte-d'Or department

References

Communes of Côte-d'Or